The United Aborigines Mission (UAM) (also known as UAM Ministries, United Aborigines' Mission (Australia), and United Aborigines' Mission of Australia) was one of the largest missions in Australia, having dozens of missionaries and stations, and covering Western Australia, New South Wales and South Australia in the 1900s. It was first established in New South Wales in 1895.

The UAM ran residential institutions for the care, education and conversion to Christianity of Aboriginal children, mostly on mission stations or in children's homes. It was mentioned in the Bringing Them Home Report (1997) as an institution that housed Indigenous children forcibly removed from their families.

UAM-operated missions 
In 1924 the UAM opened its first mission at Oodnadatta. In 1926 the mission moved to Quorn, where it was called the Colebrook Children's Home.

The UAM also opened missions at Swan Reach (which was later moved to Gerard and taken over by the Government in 1961–2), Nepabunna, Ooldea and Finniss Springs.

See also
 Australian Aborigines advocate 
The Stolen Generations

References

External links
 One Blood: 200 Years of Aboriginal Encounter with Christianity

Australian Aboriginal missions
Stolen Generations institutions